Pierre Malinowski (born 5 August 1987) is a former French soldier and former parliamentary assistant to the European Parliament. Malinowski is the founder and president of a Russian organization, the Foundation for the Development of Russian-French Historical Initiatives, since 2018. He lectures around the world on aspects of French history and culture. He was granted Russian citizenship on 22 July 2022.

His actions and those of his foundation have elicited controversy.

Biography
Pierre Malinowski was born in Reims, France, to a family of amateur historian and mayor of Orainville, Alain Malinowski. He received his junior school certificate, and join the Foreign Legion at 18 years old. After serving with them for 6 months, he left to join the Armoured Cavalry Arm of the French Army. There, he participated in several military operations, notably in Lebanon, Africa, and the United Arab Emirates. After 8 years, he left the army due to an injury. Malinowski has lived in Russia since 2017.

Pierre Malinowski was invited to the inauguration of Vladimir Putin in Kremlin in May 2018. Known to be close to the Russian president, as well as to Dmitry Peskov and also to Vladislav Surkov, he continues his work to consolidate Franco-Russian relations through major historical and cultural projects.

Political life
In 2014, he started to work in the European Parliament as a parliamentary assistant for French far-right politicians Jean-Marie Le Pen and Aymeric Chauprade. In this role, Pierre Malinowski went on many missions abroad, notably in Russia, where he built relationships and cultural connections between Russia and France. In 2015, he met President of Russia Vladimir Putin and other senior officials.

Implication in the Air Cocaine affair 
In August 2015, Malinowski participated in the extraction of two French pilots in the Dominican Republic, known as the Air Cocaine affair. He said to France 2 that he had participated in this as "military solidarity".

Foundation for the Development of Russian-French Historical Initiatives
Since 2017, he has organized many historical projects in Russia, which are based on the common history of France and Russia. In October 2018, he founded the Foundation for the Development of Russian-French Historical Initiatives in Moscow and presented it to the press-secretary of the Russian president, Dmitry Peskov.

Russian Expedition in France
In 2016 and 2017, Malinowski organised an archaeological dig in Cormicy, France. During this excavation, on December 24, 2016, he found the remains of a soldier of the Russian expeditionary force from World War I. It was the first official case in France since the end of the World War I of finding a missing Russian soldier. During a second dig in August 2017, Malinowski found the remains of a second Russian soldier. This case was presented to Sylvain Tesson and the Russian ambassador in France, Alexander Orlov.

Normandie-Niemen Regiment
Malinowski researched about the Normandie-Niemen Regiment. In 2012, he met the last French pilot of the regiment, Gaël Taburet. In August 2018, after a year of research in the French and Russian archives, he found the location of the first Normandy-Niemen plane, the Yak-1 model. The plane was found during his work with the Russia's Ministry of Defence. In the media, this case is known as a symbol of the Franco-Russian friendship against Nazism.

Russian campaign
In May 2019, the Foundation for the Development of Russian-French Historical Initiatives organized a major historical project between France and Russia. An archeological expedition took place in the Smolensk region, Russia. The team of researchers was led by Malinowski and made up of different specialists, including topographers, historians, and French and Russian students. The main excavation took place in the area where the Battle of Valutino took place, where more than 12,000 soldiers died. As a result, the expedition found many artifacts, as well as the remains of soldiers and horses.

General Charles Etienne Gudin 
In 2017, Malinowski organised an expedition to find the body of Charles Etienne Gudin, one of Napoleon's top generals. The remains were successfully found by his team and research was supported by the Kremlin. The general's body was buried in the city of Smolensk, Russia. In 2019, the results of the DNA analysis confirmed that the body belonged to General Charles Etienne Gudin. The body of General Gudin will be repatriated to the Les Invalides in 2021 and will be buried during an official ceremony in front of two Presidents, Vladimir Putin and Emmanuel Macron. Due to the fact that the French government refused to repatriate General Gudin, Pierre Malinowski decided to independently organize the procedure for returning the remains of the general from Moscow to Paris on July 13, 2021 via an Airbus A320 aircraft. General Gudin was finally buried on December 2, 2021 at Les Invalides alongside Napoleon in the presence of Minister Geneviève Darrieussecq and Chief of the Armed Forces Thierry Burkhard.

Vyazma Project
In September 2019, French and Russian teams, led by Pierre Malinowski, found 126 bodies of soldiers from Napoleon's army,  including three women and three child drummers, killed in France's retreat from Russia in November 1812 during the Battle of Vyazma. The soldiers were buried with military honors in Vyazma near the Saint-Catherine cemetery on 13 February 2021. after four months of preparations. This ceremony was organised and financed by the Foundation (25% from the price of the monument were financed by Souvenir Napoléonien). The French Embassy was represented by the Defence Attache, General Martin and 6 other diplomats. This ceremony, celebrating peace, united former enemies, such as the Prince Murat, Grand Duke George Romanov and the descendant of Marsal Mikhail Kutuzov.

The Crimean War
From 1 October to 20 October, the first major Franco-Russian archaeological project took place in Sevastopol and elsewhere in Crimea. Despite the international situation due to COVID-19, Pierre Malinowski managed to organize one of the only international cooperation projects of 2020 in Crimea. For three weeks, French experts such as Michel Signoli of
the CNRS worked with their Russian counterparts from the Academy of Sciences to find soldier's bodies from the Crimean War. Dozens of remains of French, English and Russian soldiers were found in Sevastopol, Inkermann and Alma.

In addition, Russia and the government of Sevastopol have authorized Pierre Malinowski to organize the funerals of more than 150 French soldiers, found in 2013 in Sevastopol during construction work and which had since remained in plastic bags waiting for France to make funeral arrangements. They are now buried in the cemetery of Sevastopol, where more than 20,000 other French soldiers rest.

Stalingrad Project 

Between 19 and 30 April 2021, a project on the theme of the Battle of Stalingrad  was organized in Volgograd.

Leningrad Project 

On 29 October 2021, the foundation organized a gathering of veterans from Russia, France and the United States, in St. Petersburg at the Piskarevskoye Memorial Cemetery, to pay homage to the defence of the Siege of Leningrad.

The Winterberg Tunnel 
On 4 and 5 May 1917 in Craonne (Chemin des Dames), more than 275 young German soldiers of the R.I.R 111 from Wurtenberg disappeared in a tunnel. The nearly 300-meter-long tunnel was used to supply the front line with men, arms and ammunition.

The French artillery managed to destroy the two entrances and the 275 soldiers remained stranded more than 20 meters underground. Only three were saved a week later. After more than 20 years of research by his father, Alain Malinowski, to locate the Winterberg tunnel, Pierre Malinowski, his brother and his team found the tunnel. He defines this tunnel as his most beautiful discovery and the "Pompeii of the Great War”.

Published works
"The incredible return of General Gudin", brochure, 2020 (French).

References

1987 births
Living people
Military personnel from Reims
Historians of France
21st-century French historians
Historians of World War II
Historians of World War I
Historians of the Napoleonic Wars
Historians of Russia
France–Russia relations